Kharji Kola (also Romanized as Kharjī Kolā; also known as Āgtījkolā and Khajī Kolā) is a village in Lalehabad Rural District, Lalehabad District, Babol County, Mazandaran Province, Iran. At the 2006 census, its population was 357, in 87 families.

References 

Populated places in Babol County